The 2012 United States House of Representatives elections in Massachusetts were held on Tuesday, November 6, 2012, to elect the nine U.S. representatives from the state of Massachusetts, a loss of one seat following the 2010 census, for service in the 113th Congress from January 3, 2013, to January 3, 2015. The elections coincided with the elections of other federal and state offices, including a quadrennial presidential election.  The candidate elected in each of the state's congressional districts was a member the Democratic Party.

Primary elections were held on September 6, 2012. This primary was on a Thursday, which is rare in Massachusetts, and it was moved from Tuesday, September 18, 2012, because of a conflicting religious holiday.

Overview

District 1

Democrat Richard Neal, who has represented the 2nd district since 1989, was redistricted into the 1st district. He ran for re-election.

Democratic primary

Candidates

Nominee
 Richard Neal, incumbent U.S. Representative

Eliminated in primary
 Andrea F. Nuciforo Jr., Middle Berkshire Register of Deeds and former state senator
 Bill Shein, writer

Primary results

General election

Results

District 2

Since 1991, Democrat John Olver, has represented the 1st district, most of which remains in the proposed new 1st district. He was to have been redistricted to the 2nd district, except that he announced his retirement two weeks before the new districts were proposed.

Democrat Jim McGovern, who was redistricted from the 3rd district, ran for re-election.

Democratic primary

Candidates

Nominee
Jim McGovern, incumbent U.S. Representative

Eliminated in primary
William Feegbeh

Declined
John Olver, incumbent U.S. Representative
Dennis Rosa, state representative

Primary results

Republican primary

Declined 
Gregg Lisciotti, real estate developer
Dean Mazzarella, Mayor of Leominster

General election

Results

District 3

Democrat Niki Tsongas, who was redistricted from the 5th district, ran for re-election.  She was unopposed in the primary.

Democratic primary

Candidates

Nominee
Niki Tsongas, incumbent U.S. Representative

Primary results

Republican primary

Candidates

Nominee
 Jon Golnik, business consultant and nominee for the 5th district in 2010

Eliminated in primary
 Tom Weaver, businessman and candidate for the 5th district in 2010</ref>

Primary results

General election

Polling

Results

District 4

Democrat Barney Frank, who has represented the 4th district since 1981, retired rather than run for re-election.

Democratic primary

Candidates

Nominee
 Joseph Kennedy III, Middlesex County assistant district attorney

Eliminated in primary
 Rachel Brown, LaRouche activist and candidate for this seat in 2010 
 Herb Robinson, software engineer

Withdrawn
Paul Heroux, businessman

Declined
Ruth Balser, state representative
Michael Burstein, author and member of the Brookline Town Meeting
Cynthia Creem, state senator
William A. Flanagan, Mayor of Fall River
Barney Frank, incumbent U.S. Representative
Deborah Goldberg, former chair of the Brookline Board of Selectmen
Alan Khazei, co-founder of the City Year non-profit
Jesse Mermell, Brookline Selectwoman
Marc Pacheco, state senator
Michael P. Ross, Boston City Councilor
James Segel, former state representative
David Simas, former policy adviser to Governor Deval Patrick
Sam Sutter, Bristol County district attorney
James E. Timilty, state senator
Setti Warren, mayor of Newton
Mike Rodrigues, state senator
James Vallee, state representative

Primary results

Republican primary

Candidates

Nominee
 Sean Bielat, technology executive and nominee for this seat in 2010

Eliminated in primary
 Elizabeth Childs, psychiatrist and member of the Brookline School Committee
 David Steinhof, dentist

Declined
 Jay Barrows, state representative 
 Brian Herr, former Hopkinton Selectman
 Richard J. Ross, state senator
 Tom Wesley, businessman and nominee for the 2nd district in 2010

Primary results

General election

Endorsements

Polling

Results

District 5

Democrat Ed Markey was redistricted from the 7th district, having represented it since 1976.

Democratic primary

Candidates

Nominee
Ed Markey, incumbent U.S. Representative

Primary results

Republican primary

Candidates

Nominee
 Tom Tierney, consulting actuary

Eliminated in primary
 Frank John Addivinola, Jr., attorney
 Jeff Semon, financial consultant

Withdrawn
 Gerry Dembrowski, physician and nominee for the 7th district in 2010

Primary results

General election

Results

District 6

Democrat John Tierney has represented the 6th district since 1997. Daniel Fishman, a Libertarian candidate, who has never run for office before also ran.
Veteran and military commentator Seth Moulton considered running in the general election as an Independent, but decided against it in July 2012, citing the short time frame left for him to mount a serious campaign.

Democratic primary

Candidates

Nominee
John Tierney, incumbent U.S. Representative

Primary results

Republican primary

Candidates

Nominee
 Richard R. Tisei, former Minority Leader of the Massachusetts Senate and nominee for Lieutenant Governor in 2010

Withdrawn
 Bill Hudak, Tea Party-endorsed lawyer and candidate for this seat in 2010 but withdrew on January 23, 2012, to pursue "a business opportunity".

Primary results

General election

Endorsements

Polling

Predictions

Results

District 7

In the redistricting Act, this district became a majority-minority district, increasing its reach over several minority precincts near Boston. Democrat Mike Capuano, who was redistricted from the 8th district, having represented it since 1999, ran for re-election.

Democratic primary

Candidates

Nominee
Mike Capuano, incumbent U.S. Representative

Primary results

Independents
Karla Romero, founding President and CEO of the non-profit Mass Appeal International and a former Miss USA contestant

General election

Results

District 8

Democrat Stephen Lynch, who was redistricted from the old 9th district, will run in the 8th district.

Democrat William R. Keating, who was redistricted from the old , announced that he would move to Cape Cod (where he already has a summer home), and run there, putting him in the new 9th district (most of which includes his incumbent district) instead of competing against Lynch.

Democratic primary

Candidates

Nominee
Stephen Lynch, incumbent U.S. Representative

Declined
William R. Keating, incumbent U.S. Representative

Primary results

Republican primary

Candidates

Nominee
 Joe Selvaggi, US Navy veteran of the first Gulf War and small business owner

Eliminated in primary
 Matias Temperley, Iraq War veteran and student

Primary results

General election

Results

District 9

As discussed above, he moved to the 9th District. Bristol County

Democratic primary

Candidates

Nominee
 William R. Keating, incumbent

Eliminated in primary
 Sam Sutter, Bristol County District Attorney

Declined
 Mark Montigny, state senator 
 William A. Flanagan, Mayor of Fall River
 Scott W. Lang, former Mayor of New Bedford 
 Therese Murray, President of the Massachusetts Senate 
 Robert O'Leary, former state senator

Primary results

Republican primary

Candidates

Nominee
 Christopher Sheldon, businessman

Eliminated in primary
 Adam Chaprales, former Sandwich Selectman

Declined
 Timothy Cruz, Plymouth County District Attorney 
 Vinny deMacedo, state representative
 Thomas Hodgson, Bristol County Sheriff
 Jeff Perry, former state representative 2010 Republican nominee for Massachusetts' 10th congressional district will not run.

General election

Results

See also 
 United States Senate election in Massachusetts, 2012

References

External links
 Elections Division of the Massachusetts Secretary of the Commonwealth
 Massachusetts U.S. House from OurCampaigns.com
 Campaign contributions for U.S. Congressional races in Massachusetts from OpenSecrets
Outside spending at the Sunlight Foundation
 Local politics at The Boston Herald
 

United States House of Representatives
2012
Massachusetts